Barki or Barqi may refer to

People
Ahmad Ali Barqi Azmi (born 1954), Indian Urdu poet
Ahmed Barki (born 1980), Moroccan boxer
Henri Barki, Turkish-Canadian social scientist
Justin Barki (born 2000), Indonesian tennis player
Khairi Barki (born 1995), Algerian footballer

Places
Barqi, Razavi Khorasan, Iran
Cheshmeh Barqi, Iran
Qasemabad-e Cheshmeh Barqi, Iran
Barki, Pakistan
Barki Badhal, Pakistan
Barki, Poland

Other
Barki.official, a high end clothing brand
Barkchi, a football club in Tajikistan
Barqi Tojik, a national power company of Tajikistan

See also
Barkis (disambiguation)